In the Hands of God is the thirteenth studio album by Christian band Newsboys. It was released on 5 May 2009, being the last album the band released before the departure of singer and founding member Peter Furler. It also features the return of Jody Davis, after a five-year hiatus, the first album on which keyboard player Jeff Frankenstein took on some production duties, and is the first album to feature any recording with Michael Tait as lead vocalist since singing guest vocals on "The Fad of the Land" from their 2002 live DVD Thrive: From The Rock 'N' Roll Hall of Fame. Tait later replaced Furler.

Release
 In the Hands of God debuted at No. 1 on the CCM charts, and No. 28 on the Billboard 200 chart, peaking higher on the pop charts than any of their previous albums.

Track listing

Personnel 
Newsboys
 Peter Furler – lead and backing vocals
 Jody Davis – guitars, backing vocals
 Jeff Frankenstein – keyboards, keyboard bass, backing vocals
 Duncan Phillips – drums, percussion

Additional musicians
 Max Hsu – keyboards
 Dave Perkins – guitar riffs (1)
 Stu G – guitar riffs (3, 4)
 Dave Ghazarian – guitar riffs (3, 4)
 Brian Gocher – guitar riffs (3, 4), string arrangements 
 Phil Joel – backing vocals (5)
 Michael Tait – backing vocals (5)
 Christian Rowe – backing vocals (5)

Production
 Peter Furler – producer 
 Jeff Frankenstein – producer, engineer  
 Max Hsu – producer, engineer, cover photography 
 Dale Bray – executive producer 
 Wes Campbell – executive producer
 Brian Gocher – engineer 
 Joe Baldridge – additional engineer 
 F. Reid Shippen – mixing at Robot Lemon, Nashville, Tennessee
 Lee Bridges – editing
 Ainslie Grosser – editing
 Buckley Miller – mix assistant, editing assistant 
 Dan Shike – mastering at Tone and Volume Mastering, Nashville, Tennessee
 Breezy Baldwin – design, packaging 
 David Dobson – additional photography

References

Newsboys albums
2009 albums
Inpop Records albums